Cova Lima is a municipality of East Timor, in the Southwest part of the country. It has a population of 59,455 (Census 2010) and an area of 1,230 km2. The capital of the municipality is Suai, which lies 136 km from Dili, the national capital.

Etymology
There are two different explanations for the municipality's name. First, it could be derived from koba (a basket used for ritual acts) and lima, the Tetum word for 'five'. The combination is said to represent either the five mythical daughters of the Liurai (traditional title of a Timorese ruler) of Fohorem Nutetu, or five kingdoms consisting of Fatumea, Dakolo, Lookeu, Sisi and Maudemi.

According to a second explanation, the English language name of the municipality is said to be a Portuguese approximation of the words kaua lima or portmanteau Kaualima, which means 'five crows' in Tetum.

It has been asserted that the Portuguese version of the name, perhaps intentionally, has a symbolically derogatory meaning, namely 'Five Graves' or 'Five Holes', as the Portuguese word cova means 'grave' or 'hole'. According to that assertion, the Portuguese version may also be a "... form of cultural and mind de-colonization ..." [sic - colonization] of the local name.

Geography

Cova Lima borders the Timor Sea to the south, the municipalities of Bobonaro to the north, Ainaro to the east, and the Indonesian province of East Nusa Tenggara to the west.

Administrative posts
The administrative posts of Cova Lima are Fatululic, Fatumean, Fohorem, Zumalai, Maucatar, Suai, and Tilomar.

References

Notes

Bibliography

External links 

  – official site (in Tetum with some content in English)
  – information page on Ministry of State Administration site 

 
Municipalities of East Timor